DeButts, sometimes spelt as deButts or De Butts, is a surname. Notable people with the surname include:

Augustus De Butts (1770–1853), British Royal Engineer officer
Elisha De Butts (1773–1831), American physician
John D. deButts (1915–1986), American businessman
Harry A. deButts (d. 1983), American businessman
Henry De Butts, United States Army captain
Samuel DeButts, American physician